Crypsotidia remanei is a moth of the family Erebidae first described by Wiltshire in 1977. It is found in Cape Verde, Ghana, Mauritania, Niger, Nigeria, Senegal and Sudan.

The larvae feed on Acacia albida.

References

Moths described in 1977
Crypsotidia
Moths of Cape Verde
Insects of West Africa